The Lichenotheliaceae are a family of fungi, and the only family in the order Lichenotheliales, which is in the class Dothideomycetes. The family contains three genera.

References

Dothideomycetes
Dothideomycetes families
Taxa described in 1986
Taxa named by Aino Henssen